The Best of Josh Pyke (subtitled + B-Sides & Rarities) is the first greatest hits album by Australian musician, Josh Pyke. It was released on 30 June 2017 by Ivy League Records and it peaked at number 80 on the ARIA Charts.

The album arrives 10 years after the release of his debut studio album, Memories & Dust, and features singles, personal picks and rare tracks along with two brand new songs. Pyke said "When I look back, I can see similar threads across my albums. There's a really strong theme about the passing of time, and how past experiences manifest themselves at different points in your life."

The album was supported with an Australian tour across July and August 2017. The album artwork is by illustrator James Hancock, the artist responsible for many of Pyke's early album art. Pyke said "As soon as I decided to do the Best Of, it felt natural to get James to do the art. We went to high school together, and have witnessed each other forge successful careers in the arts, so it was lovely to take that full circle for this album."

Track listing 

 Current Works, volume 1 (2004) and The Doldrums single/EP (2004) (released by 'Night Hour') were re-issued in 2005 as Recordings 2003–2005

Charts

Release history

References

2017 compilation albums
Josh Pyke albums
Ivy League Records albums
Compilation albums by Australian artists